In mathematics, in the area of quantum information geometry, the Bures metric (named after Donald Bures) or Helstrom metric (named after Carl W. Helstrom) defines an infinitesimal distance between density matrix operators defining quantum states. It is a quantum generalization of the Fisher information metric, and is identical to the Fubini–Study metric when restricted to the pure states alone.

Definition
The Bures metric  may be defined as

where  is Hermitian 1-form operator implicitly given by

which is a special case of a continuous Lyapunov equation.

Some of the applications of the Bures metric include that given a target error, it allows the calculation of the minimum number of measurements to distinguish two different states and the use of the volume element as a candidate for the Jeffreys prior  probability density for mixed quantum states.

Bures distance
The Bures distance is the finite version of the infinitesimal square distance described above and is given
by 

where the fidelity function is defined 
as

Another associated function is the Bures arc also known as Bures angle,  Bures length or quantum angle, defined as

which is a measure of the statistical distance
between quantum states.

Quantum Fisher information
The Bures metric can be seen as the quantum equivalent of the Fisher information metric and can be rewritten in terms of the variation of coordinate parameters as 

In cases where they do not have the same rank, there is an additional term on the right hand side.
 is the Symmetric logarithmic derivative operator (SLD) defined from

In this way, one has

where the quantum Fisher metric (tensor components) is identified as

The definition of the SLD implies that the quantum Fisher metric is 4 times the Bures metric. In other words, given that  are components of the Bures metric tensor, one has

As it happens with the classical Fisher information metric, the quantum Fisher metric can be used to find the Cramér–Rao bound of the covariance.

Explicit formulas
The actual computation of the Bures metric is not evident from the definition, so, some formulas were developed for that purpose. For 2x2 and 3x3 systems, respectively, the quadratic form of the Bures metric is calculated as

For general systems, the Bures metric can be written in terms of the eigenvectors and eigenvalues of the density matrix  as

as an integral,

or in terms of Kronecker product and vectorization,

where  denotes complex conjugate, and  denotes conjugate transpose. This formula holds for invertible density matrices. For non-invertible density matrices, the inverse above is substituted by the Moore-Penrose pseudoinverse. Alternatively, the expression can be also computed by performing a limit on a certain mixed and thus invertible state.

Two-level system
The state of a two-level system can be parametrized with three variables as 

The components of the Bures metric in this parametrization can be calculated as
.
The Bures measure can be calculated by taking the square root of the determinant to find

which can be used to calculate the Bures volume as

Three-level system
The state of a three-level system can be parametrized with eight variables as 

where  are the eight Gell-Mann matrices and  the 8-dimensional Bloch vector satisfying certain constraints.

See also
 Fubini–Study metric
 Fidelity of quantum states
 Fisher information
 Fisher information metric

References

Further reading

Quantum information science